Shane Sutcliffe (born June 17, 1975) is a Canadian former professional boxer who competed from 1992 to 2004. He is referred to as "Kid Thunder" by his fans.

Career
Sutcliffe was born in Victoria, British Columbia, Canada and raised in Regina, Saskatchewan, before moving to Nanaimo, British Columbia at age 12. He had no formal amateur boxing career; after winning 22 "Toughman Contests" in Canada, he made his professional boxing debut in 1992 at the age of 17.  His first fight resulted in a sixth-round decision victory over Joe Wade.  Shortly afterward he moved to Los Angeles, California and eventually Las Vegas, Nevada, to train with the legendary Eddie Futch. He won other fights by unexpected margins, including a 3-round defeat of Ray Phillips  

In 1997, Sutcliffe moved to and fought out of Montreal, Quebec, after signing a contract with International Boxing Management Interbox.  On April 3, 1998, he defeated Ben Perlini via sixth round knockout to win the Canadian Heavyweight championship. In his third defense of the title on February 5, 1999, Sutcliffe lost via 12th-round TKO to former World titleholder Trevor Berbick in Montreal.  His contract was then dropped by Interbox as a result. He challenged Berbick again for the title on May 26, 2000, in Vancouver.  However, he dropped a close 12 round unanimous decision in that contest.

Sutcliffe took over 2 years off from boxing to start a family after losing to fellow Canadian Patrice L'Heureux on November 30, 2001.  After the birth of his son, Sutcliffe worked construction to provide a steadier source of income for his new family. However, he returned to the sport in 2004, dropping decisions to Wesley Martin and Louis Monaco.   

Sutcliffe is what is termed a journeyman fighter, one who "journeys" to a variety of places (often on short notice) to provide relatively easy competition for up-and-coming prospects or fading former champions. He counted Tyrell Biggs, Leon Spinks, Trevor Berbick, Oleg Maskaev, Brian Nielsen, and David Tua among the opponents he faced. As of the beginning of 2006, his ring record stands at 25 wins (15 knockouts), 14 losses, and one draw in 40 professional contests.

Professional boxing record

|-
|align="center" colspan=8|25 Wins (15 knockouts, 10 decisions), 14 Losses (5 knockouts, 9 decisions), 1 Draw 
|-
| align="center" style="border-style: none none solid solid; background: #e3e3e3"|Result
| align="center" style="border-style: none none solid solid; background: #e3e3e3"|OppRecord
| align="center" style="border-style: none none solid solid; background: #e3e3e3"|Opponent
| align="center" style="border-style: none none solid solid; background: #e3e3e3"|Type
| align="center" style="border-style: none none solid solid; background: #e3e3e3"|Round
| align="center" style="border-style: none none solid solid; background: #e3e3e3"|Date
| align="center" style="border-style: none none solid solid; background: #e3e3e3"|Location
| align="center" style="border-style: none none solid solid; background: #e3e3e3"|Notes
|-align=center
|Loss
|
|align=left| Louis Monaco
|UD
|10
|24/04/2004
|align=left| Billings, Montana, U.S.
|align=left|
|-
|Loss
|
|align=left| Wesley Martin
|SD
|4
|07/02/2004
|align=left| Rochester, Washington, U.S.
|align=left|
|-
|Loss
|
|align=left| Patrice L'Heureux
|UD
|6
|30/11/2001
|align=left| Montreal, Quebec, Canada
|align=left|
|-
|Win
|
|align=left| Donnell Wingfield
|TKO
|2
|12/10/2001
|align=left| Niagara Falls, New York, U.S.
|align=left|
|-
|Win
|
|align=left| Marcelo Aravena
|TKO
|4
|24/05/2001
|align=left| Victoria, British Columbia, Canada
|align=left|
|-
|Win
|
|align=left| Cody Gray
|MD
|6
|28/04/2001
|align=left| Tacoma, Washington, U.S.
|align=left|
|-
|Loss
|
|align=left| Trevor Berbick
|UD
|12
|26/05/2000
|align=left| Vancouver, British Columbia, Canada
|align=left|
|-
|Loss
|
|align=left| Tim Knight
|UD
|6
|19/01/2000
|align=left| Louisville, Kentucky, U.S.
|align=left|
|-
|Loss
|
|align=left| David Tua
|TKO
|2
|23/10/1999
|align=left| Las Vegas, Nevada, U.S.
|align=left|
|-
|Loss
|
|align=left| Brian Nielsen
|KO
|5
|03/09/1999
|align=left| Copenhagen, Denmark
|align=left|
|-
|Loss
|
|align=left| Oleg Maskaev
|TKO
|2
|20/05/1999
|align=left| Tunica, Mississippi, U.S.
|align=left|
|-
|Loss
|
|align=left| Trevor Berbick
|TKO
|12
|05/02/1999
|align=left| Montreal, Quebec, Canada
|align=left|
|-
|Win
|
|align=left| Gerard Jones
|UD
|8
|06/11/1998
|align=left| Montreal, Quebec, Canada
|align=left|
|-
|Win
|
|align=left| Patrick Graham
|TKO
|2
|24/09/1998
|align=left| Montreal, Quebec, Canada
|align=left|
|-
|Win
|
|align=left| Ben Perlini
|KO
|6
|03/04/1998
|align=left| Montreal, Quebec, Canada
|align=left|
|-
|Win
|
|align=left| Don Laliberte
|KO
|2
|11/11/1997
|align=left| Montreal, Quebec, Canada
|align=left|
|-
|Win
|
|align=left| Ritchie Goosehead
|DQ
|3
|12/12/1996
|align=left| Vancouver, British Columbia, Canada
|align=left|
|-
|Win
|
|align=left| Mike Curry
|KO
|1
|19/10/1996
|align=left| Nanaimo, British Columbia, Canada
|align=left|
|-
|Loss
|
|align=left| Dale Grant
|UD
|10
|03/07/1996
|align=left| Anacortes, Washington, U.S.
|align=left|
|-
|Win
|
|align=left| Anthony Moore
|UD
|8
|11/04/1996
|align=left| Vancouver, British Columbia, Canada
|align=left|
|-
|Loss
|
|align=left| Jason Waller
|UD
|10
|01/03/1996
|align=left| Honolulu, Hawaii, U.S.
|align=left|
|-
|Draw
|
|align=left| Krishna Wainwright
|PTS
|10
|02/02/1996
|align=left| Kent, Washington, U.S.
|align=left|
|-
|Win
|
|align=left| Marcellus Brown
|TKO
|8
|27/08/1995
|align=left| Anacortes, Washington, U.S.
|align=left|
|-
|Win
|
|align=left| Wesley Martin
|PTS
|8
|09/08/1995
|align=left| Woodland Hills, California, U.S.
|align=left|
|-
|Win
|
|align=left| Steve Cortez
|KO
|2
|23/06/1995
|align=left| Cloverdale, British Columbia, Canada
|align=left|
|-
|Win
|
|align=left| Conroy Nelson
|KO
|1
|23/05/1995
|align=left| Nanaimo, British Columbia, Canada
|align=left|
|-
|Loss
|
|align=left| John Kiser
|MD
|8
|27/10/1994
|align=left| Etobicoke, Ontario, Canada
|align=left|
|-
|Win
|
|align=left| Leon Spinks
|UD
|8
|01/10/1994
|align=left| Nanaimo, British Columbia, Canada
|align=left|
|-
|Win
|
|align=left| Darryl Gray
|TKO
|3
|22/04/1994
|align=left| Nanaimo, British Columbia, Canada
|align=left|
|-
|Win
|
|align=left| Paul Phillips
|DQ
|3
|03/12/1993
|align=left| Bay Saint Louis, Mississippi, U.S.
|align=left|
|-
|Loss
|
|align=left| Tyrell Biggs
|TKO
|2
|03/12/1993
|align=left| Bay Saint Louis, Mississippi, U.S.
|align=left|
|-
|Win
|
|align=left| Matthew Brooks
|PTS
|6
|06/11/1993
|align=left| Victoria, British Columbia, Canada
|align=left|
|-
|Win
|
|align=left| Antonio Ocasio
|TKO
|2
|21/08/1993
|align=left| Kalispell, Montana, U.S.
|align=left|
|-
|Win
|
|align=left| Mark Frieon
|TKO
|1
|13/08/1993
|align=left| Cloverdale, British Columbia, Canada
|align=left|
|-
|Win
|
|align=left| Fred Peppers
|KO
|2
|30/07/1993
|align=left| Cloverdale, British Columbia, Canada
|align=left|
|-
|Win
|
|align=left| Lavell Sims
|TKO
|2
|21/11/1992
|align=left| Nanaimo, British Columbia, Canada
|align=left|
|-
|Loss
|
|align=left| John Kiser
|SD
|4
|28/10/1992
|align=left| Missoula, Montana, U.S.
|align=left|
|-
|Win
|
|align=left| Mike Smith
|KO
|2
|18/09/1992
|align=left| Bozeman, Montana, U.S.
|align=left|
|-
|Win
|
|align=left| Paul Pressley
|PTS
|4
|06/08/1992
|align=left| Miles City, Montana, U.S.
|align=left|
|-
|Win
|
|align=left|Joe Wade
|UD
|6
|08/07/1992
|align=left| New Westminster, British Columbia, Canada
|align=left|
|}

References

External links

1975 births
Canadian male boxers
Heavyweight boxers
Living people
Sportspeople from Nanaimo
Sportspeople from Victoria, British Columbia